{{Infobox television
| image              =
| caption            = 
| alt_name           = 
| genre              = Documentary
| creator            = 
| developer          = 
| writer             = 
| director           = 
| creative_director  = 
| narrated           = Doug Jeffers
| language           = English
| num_seasons        = 1
| num_episodes       = 6
| list_episodes      = 
| executive_producer = 
| producer           = 
| editor             = 
| camera             = 
| runtime            = 60 minutes
| company            = 
| channel            = VH1
| picture_format     = 
| audio_format       = 
| first_aired        = 
| last_aired         = 
| related            = 

Best of I Love the... is the eleventh installment of the I Love the... series and a series of compilation specials composed of various clips from VH1's I Love the... series. It first aired on VH1 on February 20, 2010 with "Best of I Love the 70s" hour 1, and ended with "Best of I Love the 90s" hour 2.

The clips featured in these episodes were mostly easy to license. Most of the music that had been used in the clips in their original broadcasts were replaced with generic music tracks.

Commentators
[[I Love the '70s (American TV series)#Commentators|Commentators of I Love the '70s]]
Commentators of I Love the '70s: Volume 2
Commentators of I Love the '80s
Commentators of I Love the '80s Strikes Back
Commentators of I Love the '80s 3-D
Commentators of I Love the '90s
Commentators of I Love the '90s: Part Deux

Best of I Love the '70s

Hour 1
 Welcome Back, Kotter Kiss
 Shrinky Dinks
 Metrication in the United States
 The Dating Game "Free Bird" by Lynyrd Skynyrd
 Lite-Brite
 Bell-bottoms
 Studio 54
 The Hollywood Squares "Da Ya Think I'm Sexy?" by Rod Stewart
 Bedazzler
 Pop Rocks
 Josie and the Pussycats and Josie and the Pussycats in Outer Space Wonder Woman Tab
 Ginsu
 Hank Aaron
 The Gong Show Hot pants
 Disco Demolition Night
 Rock 'n' Roll High SchoolHour 2
 Donny and Marie
 Are You There, God? It's Me, Margaret by Judy Blume
 8 Track
 View-Master
 Billy Beer
 One Day at a Time United States Bicentennial
 Up In Smoke Mood ring
 Mister Rogers' Neighborhood "The Hustle" by Van McCoy and the dance craze
 Pong
 Leisure suit
 Baby Alive
 Password Pet Rock
 K-Tel
 Sea Monkeys
 CB radios
 The Shazam!/Isis Hour Mr. Whipple
 Skateboard craze
 Big Wheel
 Smokey and the BanditBest of I Love the '80s

Hour 1
 Gremlins Miracle on Ice
 "Walk Like an Egyptian" by The Bangles
 Hungry Hungry Hippos
 Members Only
 Breakdancing and Breakin' The Day After "Land of Confusion" by Genesis
 Wacky WallWalker
 Teddy Ruxpin
 "Where's the beef?"
 "Somebody's Watching Me" by Rockwell
 Pac-Man and Ms. Pac-Man Big hair
 "Don't You Want Me" by The Human League
 "Just a Friend" by Biz Markie
 Press Your Luck Game Boy and Tetris Sunglasses
 1986 World Series and the Bill Buckner fielding error 
 "Whip It" by Devo
 Rubik's Cube
Lee Press-On nails
 Back to the FutureHour 2
 Atari
 Richard Simmons
 "If I Could Turn Back Time" by Cher
The party line
 The Royal Wedding
 "All Night Long (All Night)" by Lionel Richie
 Monster trucks
 Scratch and sniff and Trapper Keeper
 MacGyver Mullets
 "Pass the Dutchie" by Musical Youth
 Dungeons & Dragons Teen Wolf "Super Freak" by Rick James
 The fall of the Berlin Wall
 Grey Poupon
 Truly Tasteless Jokes Small Wonder Valley girl
 "Mickey" by Toni Basil
 My Buddy
 E.T. the Extra-TerrestrialBest of I Love the '90s

Hour 1
 Ally McBeal Raves
 Oakland Ebonics controversy
 Kenny G breaks the world record for longest note held
 Reality Bites The Clinton-Lewinsky scandal
 "The Humpty Dance" by Digital Underground
 Fanny packs
 Run Lola Run "Rico Suave" by Gerardo
 Mark McGwire vs. Sammy Sosa
 Fabio
 The Dream Team
 Moviefone
 Blues Traveler
 Provocative ads for Guess
 Zima
 Where's Waldo? "Tubthumping" by Chumbawamba
 Supermarket Sweep GhostHour 2
 Melrose Place Kerri Strug
 Jewel
 Caller ID
 Ross Perot
 The Wonderbra
 The Caesar haircut
 Planet Hollywood
 Jenny McCarthy
 Dolly the sheep
 Energizer Bunny
 Thighmaster
 George Foreman makes a boxing comeback and creates the George Foreman Grill
 Hootie and the Blowfish
 George H.W. Bush vomits on Japan's prime minister
 Zubaz
 MTV's guest VJ Jesse Camp
 Benedictine Monks' Chant album
 Starter Jackets and Pagers
 Singles''

External links
 
 
 
 
 
 
 

VH1 original programming
Nostalgia television shows